A protein kinase inhibitor is a type of enzyme inhibitor that blocks the action of one or more protein kinases. Protein kinases are enzymes that phosphorylate (add a phosphate, or PO4, group) to a protein and can modulate its function.

The phosphate groups are usually added to serine, threonine, or tyrosine amino acids on the protein: most kinases act on both serine and threonine, the tyrosine kinases act on tyrosine, and a number (dual-specificity kinases) act on all three. There are also protein kinases that phosphorylate other amino acids, including histidine kinases that phosphorylate histidine residues.

Phosphorylation regulates many biological processes, and protein kinase inhibitors can be used to treat diseases due to hyperactive protein kinases (including mutant or overexpressed kinases in cancer) or to modulate cell functions to overcome other disease drivers.

Clinical use
Kinase inhibitors such as dasatinib are often used in the treatment of cancer and inflammation.

Some of the kinase inhibitors used in treating cancer are inhibitors of tyrosine kinases.
The effectiveness of kinase inhibitors on various cancers can vary from patient to patient.

Examples 
There are several drugs launched or in development that target protein kinases and the receptors that activate them:

Comparison of available agents

Note:
AD = Approval date.
MS = Myelosuppression.
D = Diarrhoea.
FR = Fluid retention.
As far as myelosuppression, diarrhoea and fluid retention goes: +++ means >70% of patients exhibit clinically significant myelosuppression. ++ means 30-70% of patients exhibit significant myelosuppression. + means 10-30% of patients exhibit significant myelosuppression. - means 0-10% of patients exhibit this side effect.
General references templates are given, which refer the reader to the respective drug database.

See also
 Tyrosine kinase inhibitor

References

External links
 Ayala-Aguilera, C. C.; Valero, T.; Lorente-Macías, Á.; Baillache, D. J.; Croke, S.; Unciti-Broceta, A. Small Molecule Kinase Inhibitor Drugs (1995–2021): Medical Indication, Pharmacology, and Synthesis. J. Med. Chem. 2021.
 PKIDB: A searchable database of kinase inhibitors in clinical trials containing physicochemical properties and structures, protein kinase targets, therapeutic indications, year of first approval, and trade names *
 
 IC50 values for common inhibitors
 in 
Attwood, Misty M; Fabbro, Doriano; Sokolov, Aleksandr V; Knapp, Stephan;, Schiöth, Helgi B. (2021) Trends in kinase drug discovery: targets, indications and inhibitor design. Nat Rev Drug Discov. doi: 10.1038/s41573-021-00252-y. PMID 34354255
A list of US FDA-approved small molecule protein kinase inhibitors, their protein kinase targets, therapeutic indications, and links to the FDA label are provided at the Blue Ridge Institute for Medical Research web site. Roskoski, R. Jr. (2021) Properties of FDA-approved small molecule protein kinase inhibitors: A 2021 update. Pharmacol Res.165:105463. doi:10.1016/j.phrs.2021.105463. PMID 33513356